The 1964–65 NBA season was the Celtics' 19th season in the NBA. The Celtics finished the season by winning their eighth NBA Championship, defeating the Los Angeles Lakers in five games. In 1996, the team was named one of the 10 greatest teams in NBA history. In addition five players were inducted into the Hall of Fame - K. C. Jones, Sam Jones, Tom Heinsohn, Bill Russell, and John Havlicek. Sam Jones, Havlicek, and Russell were selected as among the NBA's 50 greatest players. Both Red Auerbach and John Thompson were elected into the Hall of Fame as coaches.

This season is best noted for Havlicek's heroic "steal" of the ball against the Philadelphia 76ers in Game 7 of the Eastern Division final, immortalized in a commentary by Johnny Most where he exclaims that "Havlicek stole the ball." This is considered one of the greatest NBA moments, and its importance over time overshadowed the subsequent final between the Celtics and Lakers (of which there were many played in that era).

Offseason

NBA Draft
The 1965 NBA Draft took place on May 4, 1964.

Roster

Regular season

Season standings

Record vs. opponents

Game log

Playoffs

|- align="center" bgcolor="#ccffcc"
| 1
| April 4
| Philadelphia
| W 108–98
| Tom Heinsohn (23)
| Bill Russell (32)
| Bill Russell (6)
| Boston Garden13,909
| 1–0
|- align="center" bgcolor="#ffcccc"
| 2
| April 6
| @ Philadelphia
| L 103–109
| Sam Jones (40)
| Bill Russell (16)
| Bill Russell (5)
| Municipal Auditorium9,790
| 1–1
|- align="center" bgcolor="#ccffcc"
| 3
| April 8
| Philadelphia
| W 112–94
| S. Jones, Havlicek (24)
| Bill Russell (26)
| Bill Russell (8)
| Boston Garden13,909
| 2–1
|- align="center" bgcolor="#ffcccc"
| 4
| April 9
| @ Philadelphia
| L 131–134 (OT)
| Sam Jones (36)
| Bill Russell (25)
| K. C. Jones (10)
| Municipal Auditorium9,294
| 2–2
|- align="center" bgcolor="#ccffcc"
| 5
| April 11
| Philadelphia
| W 114–108
| Sam Jones (29)
| Bill Russell (28)
| K. C. Jones (9)
| Boston Garden13,909
| 3–2
|- align="center" bgcolor="#ffcccc"
| 6
| April 13
| @ Philadelphia
| L 106–112
| Tom Sanders (25)
| Bill Russell (21)
| Russell, K. C. Jones (5)
| Municipal Auditorium11,182
| 3–3
|- align="center" bgcolor="#ccffcc"
| 7
| April 15
| Philadelphia
| W 110–109
| Sam Jones (37)
| Bill Russell (8)
| K. C. Jones (10)
| Boston Garden13,909
| 4–3
|-

|- align="center" bgcolor="#ccffcc"
| 1
| April 18
| Los Angeles
| W 142–110
| Sam Jones (25)
| Bill Russell (28)
| K. C. Jones (8)
| Boston Garden13,909
| 1–0
|- align="center" bgcolor="#ccffcc"
| 2
| April 19
| Los Angeles
| W 129–123
| John Havlicek (24)
| Bill Russell (25)
| Bill Russell (10)
| Boston Garden13,909
| 2–0
|- align="center" bgcolor="#ffcccc"
| 3
| April 21
| @ Los Angeles
| L 105–126
| Sam Jones (35)
| Bill Russell (19)
| Larry Siegfried (5)
| Los Angeles Memorial Sports Arena14,243
| 2–1
|- align="center" bgcolor="#ccffcc"
| 4
| April 23
| @ Los Angeles
| W 112–99
| Sam Jones (37)
| Bill Russell (23)
| Russell, K. C. Jones (5)
| Los Angeles Memorial Sports Arena15,217
| 3–1
|- align="center" bgcolor="#ccffcc"
| 5
| April 25
| Los Angeles
| W 129–96
| S. Jones, Russell (22)
| Bill Russell (30)
| K. C. Jones (9)
| Boston Garden13,909
| 4–1
|-

Awards and honors 
 Bill Russell, NBA Most Valuable Player Award
 Red Auerbach, NBA Coach of the Year Award
 Bill Russell, All-NBA First Team
 Sam Jones, All-NBA Second Team

References 

 Celtics on Database Basketball
  Celtics on Basketball Reference

Boston Celtics seasons
NBA championship seasons
Boston Celtics
Boston Celtics
Boston Celtics
1960s in Boston